Hotel Lenox or Lenox Hotel or Lennox Hotel may refer to several hotels in the United States:

Hotel Lenox, aka Hartford Hotel, a Beaux-Arts style hotel from 1899, in Ann Street Historic District, in Hartford, Connecticut
Lenox Hotel (Lenox, Iowa), listed on the NRHP in Iowa 
The Lenox Hotel, a luxury hotel in downtown Boston, Massachusetts
Madison-Lenox Hotel, a former hotel in Detroit, Michigan
Lennox Hotel, a former hotel in St Louis Missouri